Bradyctena is a genus of moths in the family Geometridae.

Species
 Bradyctena trychnoptila (Turner, 1906)

References
 Bradyctena at Markku Savela's Lepidoptera and Some Other Life Forms
Natural History Museum Lepidoptera genus database

Nacophorini
Geometridae genera